Sulfachlorpyridazine (INN, USP) is a sulfonamide antibiotic drug used in poultry farming. It has been marketed as Vetisulid for use in cattle, swine and birds.

References 

Sulfonamide antibiotics